Phenidone (1-phenyl-3-pyrazolidinone) is an organic compound that is primarily used as a photographic developer. It has five to ten times the developing power as Metol. It also has low toxicity and unlike some other developers, does not cause dermatitis upon skin contact.

Phenidone is Ilford's trademark for this material, which was first prepared in 1890. It was not until 1940 that J. D. Kendall, in the laboratories of Ilford Limited, discovered the reducing properties of this compound. Large scale production did not become feasible until 1951.

Phenidone functions as a reducing agent.  It converts to the N-phenyl-hydroxypyrazole:

Preparation
Phenidone can be prepared by heating phenyl hydrazine with 3-chloropropanoic acid.

References

Photographic chemicals
Pyrazolidines
Lactams
Phenyl compounds